Roy Pierre Vernond Hendriksen (born 21 January 1969) is a Dutch professional football manager, coach and former player. During his 16-year playing career he played Eredivisie football with SC Cambuur, before retiring in 2007 and entering management with Zeelandia Middelburg. He later served as assistant manager at RKC Waalwijk, N.E.C, Brentford, Sporting CP and Al Jazira.

Playing career

A midfielder, Hendriksen spent the majority of his 16-year professional career in the Eerste Divisie in the Netherlands, most notably with Helmond Sport, BV Veendam and RBC Roosendaal. He helped SC Cambuur to promotion from the Eerste Divisie in the 1997–98 season and made 27 Eredivisie appearances the following year. He retired in 2007 after a second spell with Helmond Sport.

Managerial career

Zeelandia Middleburg 
Hendriksen began his managerial career in 2007 with Derde Klasse side Zeelandia Middelburg. He took the club to the playoff semi-finals in his debut season, before suffering relegation to the Vierde Klasse in the 2008–09 season. He departed the club in 2010. He returned on a part-time consultancy basis during the 2011–12 season.

VC Vlissingen 
Hendriksen was appointed manager at Eerste Klasse side VC Vlissingen in 2010, the club where he began his career as a player. He managed a sixth-place finish with the financially stricken club and departed at the end of the 2010–11 season. He was nominated for the Coach of the Year award at the 2011 Zeeland Football Awards.

Helmond Sport 
On 6 February 2016 it was announced that Hendriksen would return to Helmond Sport (his final club as a player) as head coach on a two-year contract from the beginning of the 2016–17 season. After a mid-table finish at the end of the 2016–17 Eerste Divisie season, a second-from-bottom finish in 2017–18 led to the club's decision to allow Hendriksen's contract to expire.

Coaching career

RKC Waalwijk 
In January 2011, Hendriksen was appointed as Ruud Brood's assistant at Eerste Divisie club RKC Waalwijk on a contract until the end of the 2010–11 season. A run of 14 wins from 17 matches saw Waalwijk win promotion to the Eredivisie as champions at the end of the season. He signed a new contract in May 2011. Hendriksen assisted Brood to a 9th-place finish and qualification to the Europa League promotion playoffs in the 2011–12 season, but they were denied a place in Europe after a 5–2 aggregate defeat to Vitesse Arnhem in the final. Brood departed Waalwijk and was replaced by Erwin Koeman as manager in the summer of 2012, who retained Hendriksen as his assistant. Waalwijk narrowly missed relegation to the Eerste Divisie in the 2012–13 season and were relegated the following year after a 4–2 aggregate defeat to S.B.V. Excelsior in the relegation playoffs. Hendriksen turned down the offer of a new three-year contract and left the club in May 2014.

N.E.C. 
Hendriksen reunited with Ruud Brood at Eerste Divisie club N.E.C. in June 2014. In a successful 2014–15 season, the pair sent N.E.C. to the Eredivisie as champions. Hendriksen left the club at the end of the campaign.

Brentford
On 1 June 2015, Hendriksen was announced as assistant to Marinus Dijkhuizen at English Championship club Brentford. A number of departures and a crippling injury list saw Brentford sitting in 19th position after eight league games, which led to Dijkhuizen and Hendriksen being removed from their positions on 28 September 2015.

Sporting CP 
On 12 November 2018, Hendriksen joined Portuguese Primeira Liga club Sporting CP as assistant to manager Marcel Keizer. He was sacked, along with Keizer, in September 2019.

Al Jazira
On 13 October 2019, Hendriksen joined UAE Pro League club Al Jazira as assistant to manager Marcel Keizer. Owing to a suspension suffered by Keizer, Hendriksen presided over a 1–0 win over Al Urooba in September 2021.

Career statistics

Honours 
SC Cambuur
 Eerste Divisie promotion playoff: 1997–98

References

1969 births
Living people
People from Goirle
Association football midfielders
Dutch footballers
Dutch expatriate football managers
SC Cambuur players
HSV Hoek players
RBC Roosendaal players
FC Eindhoven players
Dutch football managers
Brentford F.C. non-playing staff
Helmond Sport players
SC Veendam players
VC Vlissingen managers
RKC Waalwijk non-playing staff
NEC Nijmegen non-playing staff
Eerste Divisie players
Eredivisie players
VC Vlissingen players
Helmond Sport managers
Dutch expatriate sportspeople in the United Arab Emirates
Dutch expatriate sportspeople in England
Footballers from North Brabant
Dutch expatriate sportspeople in Portugal